Michael Howe may refer to:

Michael Howe (bushranger) (1787–1818), Tasmanian bushranger
Michael Howe (politician),  member of the North Dakota House of Representatives
Michael J. A. Howe (1940–2002), British cognitive psychologist
Mike Howe, musician